The PRB-111 is a square Belgian minimum metal anti-tank blast mine that consists of a block of explosive which may or may not be coated in asphalt. A central cavity on the top surface is covered by a plastic pressure plate, underneath which is a small well for a pressure fuze. The fuze used with the mine is the M5 pressure fuze, as used in the PRB M35 anti-personnel mine. A secondary fuze well is provided in the center of the base of the mine for fitting anti-handling devices.

References
 Jane's Mines and Mine Clearance 2005-2006
 

Anti-tank mines
Land mines of Belgium